Tiruchirappalli may refer to:

India

Tamil Nadu
Tiruchirappalli District, Tamil Nadu
 Tiruchirappalli – I (State Assembly Constituency),
 Tiruchirappalli West (State Assembly Constituency), 
 Tiruchirappalli – II (State Assembly Constituency), 
 Tiruchirappalli East (State Assembly Constituency),